The men's competition in the bantamweight (– 56 kg) division was held on 5 November 2011.

Schedule

Medalists

Records

Results

References

(Pages 19, 22 & 24) Start List 
2011 IWF World Championships Results Book Pages 29–31 
Results

2011 World Weightlifting Championships